The Republic of China did not recognize Outer Mongolia until 1945; neither country exchanged diplomats between 1946 and 1949. At the end of the Chinese Civil War in 1949, Mongolia recognized the People's Republic of China and the Republic of China retreated to the island of Taiwan.  The Republic of China continued to show Mongolia as part of its territory on official maps until 2002 when they recognized Mongolia as an independent country, and informal relations were established between the two sides.

In the absence of formal diplomatic relations between Mongolia and the Republic of China on Taiwan, the two countries have Trade and Economic Representative Offices which function as de facto embassies: Taiwan is represented by an office in Ulaanbaatar, and Mongolia is represented by an office in Taipei.

History

Before 1949
Throughout history, regimes on the Mongolian steppe and China have waged war on numerous occasions. China's Great Wall was constructed to ward off invading hordes from the Mongolian steppe and Central Asia. For example, the Mongols under Kublai Khan conquered much of China and established the Yuan dynasty, and Mongolia later fell under control of the Qing dynasty of China.

During the Xinhai Revolution in 1911, Outer Mongolia declared independence from China and formed the Bogd Khanate. In 1912, the Republic of China was established. Although many people of Inner Mongolia sought to accede to the new state, China retained its control over the area and reasserted control over Outer Mongolia in 1919. Consequently, Mongolia sought Soviet Russian support to reclaim its independence. In 1921, both Chinese and White Russian forces were driven out by the Red Army of the Soviet Union and pro-Soviet Mongolian forces. In 1924, the Mongolian People's Republic was formed.

Under the terms of the 1946 Sino-Soviet Treaty of Friendship, the Republic of China was to recognize both Mongolian sovereignty and independence. However, due to a border conflict on the Khovd/Sinkiang border, no diplomatic relations were established between 1946 and 1949.

After 1949
In 1952, three years after the Republic of China's retreat to the island of Taiwan (which was retroceded from Japan in 1945), the ROC government accused the Soviet Union of violating the 1946 Sino-Soviet Treaty of Friendship. The following year, the Legislative Yuan voted to abrogate the treaty. The Republic of China continued to represent China at the United Nations (UN) until 1971 and used its position as a permanent member of the UN Security Council to block the admission of the Mongolian People's Republic into the UN throughout the 1950s. The only veto cast by the ROC during its membership in the UN was in 1955, against the admission of Mongolia. Thus, Mongolia was excluded from the UN until 1960, when the Soviet Union announced that unless Mongolia was admitted, it would block the admission of all of the newly independent African states. Faced with this pressure, the ROC relented under protest.

The Legislative Yuan applied for a constitutional interpretation on 12 April 1993 to ask what the boundaries of the ROC national territory would be, while considering Outer Mongolia not included in the ROC territory. However, the Judicial Yuan in its Interpretation 328 on 26 November 1993, called the constitutional territory beyond the reach of judicial review and thus avoided the question as whether Mongolia should be considered the constitutional territory of the Republic of China.

In 1996, Taiwan's Mongolian and Tibetan Affairs Office director said "The island's National Assembly does not necessarily have to make a constitutional amendment because Outer Mongolia's independence is well established."

Relations changed in 2002, ninety-one years after Mongolia's first declaration of independence. At the time, the Republic of China still did not recognize Mongolia as an independent country; official maps of the Republic still showed Mongolia as its territory. When the Executive Yuan under the Democratic Progressive Party administration announced that Mongolian nationals would be entitled to visas rather than entry permits when traveling to Taiwan, the same as individuals from foreign countries, the Kuomintang-controlled Legislative Yuan criticized the implementation of the decision, as they had not been consulted in this regard. Later, representatives of the two governments agreed to open offices in each other's capitals; ROC's office in Ulaanbaatar was opened in September of that year. ROC's Ministry of the Interior then decided to discontinue including Mongolia on its official maps of ROC territory, and on 3 October 2002, the Ministry of Foreign Affairs announced that ROC recognizes Mongolia as an independent country. As of 2002, the ROC government recognized Mongolia as an independent country, excludes Mongolia from maps of the Republic of China and requires Mongolian citizens visiting Taiwan to produce passports.  In 2006, old laws regulating the formation of banners and monasteries in Outer Mongolia were repealed.

Education
There are approximately 1,400 Mongolian students in Taiwan, as of 2019.

Trade
In 2017, bilateral trade between Taiwan and Mongolia was valued at US$44.84 million.

See also 
 China–Mongolia relations
 Mongolians in Taiwan
 Mongolian and Tibetan Affairs Commission
 Mongolian and Tibetan Cultural Center

References

 
Taiwan
Mongolia